Perdesi is a 1958 Sindhi film directed by S. A. Ghaffar.

Cast 
Noor Mohammad Charlie
Fazlani
Shamsuddin Soomro
Mustafa Qureshi
Lali
Salomi
Rumi

Further reading
 Gazdar, Mushtaq. 1997. Pakistan Cinema, 1947-1997. Karachi: Oxford University Press.

External links
 

Sindhi-language films
Pakistani black-and-white films
1958 films